Babe Ruth is a 1991 American drama film directed by Mark Tinker and written by Michael De Guzman. The film stars Stephen Lang, Brian Doyle-Murray, Donald Moffat, Yvonne Suhor, Bruce Weitz and Lisa Zane. The film premiered on NBC on October 6, 1991. The film is adapted from the 1974 book Babe: The Legend Comes to Life by Robert W. Creamer.

Plot

Cast 
Stephen Lang as Babe Ruth
Brian Doyle-Murray as Marshall Hunt
Donald Moffat as Jacob Ruppert
Yvonne Suhor as Helen Woodford Ruth
Bruce Weitz as Miller Huggins
Lisa Zane as Claire Hodgson Ruth
William Lucking as Brother Matthias
Neal McDonough as Lou Gehrig
John Anderson as Judge Kenesaw Mountain Landis
Pete Rose as Ty Cobb
Cy Buynak as Eddie Bennet
William Flatley as Emil Fuchs
Stephen Prutting as Jimmy Walker
Thomas Wagner as Bill Killefer
Jeffery Blanchard as Jimmy Barton
Brandi Chrisman as Dorothy
Charles Fick as Waite Hoyt
Matthew Glave as Jumpin' Joe Dugan
Deborah Anne Gorman as Julia 
John Kolibab as Hod Lisenbee
Andrew May as Wally Pipp
Clint Nageotte as Young Babe
Troy Startoni as Charlie Root
Philip L. Stone as Graham McNamee
Annabelle Weenick as Mrs. Woodford
Dale Young as Fred Lieb

See also
The Babe Ruth Story - 1948 biopic starring William Bendix 
The Babe - 1992 biopic featuring John Goodman

References

External links
 

1991 television films
1991 films
1990s English-language films
American biographical drama films
1990s biographical drama films
Films scored by Steve Dorff
NBC network original films
American drama television films
1990s American films